Gilbert F. Robbins was the mayor of Providence, Rhode Island from 1887 to 1889.

Early life 
Gilbert F. Robbins was born in Burrillville, Rhode Island, to a family of farmers. He attended public schools until age 17, at which time he attended the academy at East Greenwich, where he studied "good hand-writing and ... book-keeping."
Upon finishing his studies, he joined brother-in-law Serril Mowry's ready-made clothing business. The firm, Mowry, Robbins & Company, was successful.

Robbins was interested in politics and rose through the ranks. He was elected to the Common Council from the 7th Ward in 1879, then to the General Assembly. By 1883 he was president of the Board of Aldermen.

Mayor of Providence 

As president of the Board of Aldermen, Robbins became acting mayor of Providence upon the death of Thomas A. Doyle. He won re-election in 1887 and 1888.

During his tenure, he oversaw construction of a cable car tramway on Providence's East Side and electrification of city streets.

Personal life 
Robbins married Susan Olive Arnold Whipple, daughter of Manning Arnold, of Burrilville, in 1866. They had no children. He was a Freemason and Universalist.

He died on September 27, 1889 of heart failure and is buried at Swan Point Cemetery.

References

External links 
 Providence Mayors Providence City Website
 

1838 births
1889 deaths
Mayors of Providence, Rhode Island
Rhode Island Republicans
Burials at Swan Point Cemetery
American Universalists
American Freemasons
19th-century American politicians